Thomas Guy Greenfield (November 10, 1917 – October 9, 2004) was a professional American football center/linebacker in the National Football League. Greenfield, who was born in Glendale, Arizona, played for the Green Bay Packers from 1939 to 1941. A member of the 1939 NFL Champion Packers, he played in the annual All-Star Game that year. He played college football at the University of Arizona, where he was a member of the Sigma Alpha Epsilon fraternity.

References

External links
 

1917 births
2004 deaths
Sportspeople from Glendale, Arizona
Players of American football from Arizona
American football centers
American football linebackers
Arizona Wildcats football players
Arizona Wildcats men's basketball players
Green Bay Packers players
United States Army personnel of World War II
American men's basketball players
United States Army officers